There were three special elections to the United States House of Representatives in 1997 during the 105th United States Congress.  Republicans had a net one-seat gain over the Democrats.

Summary 

Elections are listed by date and district.

|-
! 
| Frank Tejeda
|  | Democratic
| 1992
|  | Incumbent died January 30, 1997.New member elected April 12, 1997.Democratic hold.
| nowrap | 

|-
! 
| Bill Richardson
|  | Democratic
| 1982
|  | Incumbent resigned February 13, 1997 to become U.S. Ambassador to the United Nations.New member elected May 13, 1997.Republican gain.
| nowrap | 

|-
! 
| Susan Molinari
|  | Republican
| 1990 
|  | Incumbent resigned August 2, 1997, to become a journalist for CBS.New member elected November 5, 1997.Republican hold.
| nowrap | 

|}

New Mexico's 3rd district 

The election was held in the historically Democratic district after the resignation of Democrat Bill Richardson, who became the United States Ambassador to the United Nations. Bill Redmond won the May 13 election and became the only Republican to ever represent this district.

Texas's 28th district 

Incumbent Frank Tejeda died of brain cancer soon after the congressional elections. As no candidate received an outright majority during the first round on March 15, 1997 a special runoff was held on April 12, 1997, which was won by State Representative Ciro Rodriguez.

New York's 13th district

References 

 
1997